North Miami is a suburban city located in northeast Miami-Dade County, Florida, United States, about  north of Miami. The city lies on Biscayne Bay and hosts the Biscayne Bay Campus of Florida International University, and the North Miami campus of Johnson & Wales University. Originally the town of "Arch Creek", the area was incorporated as the "Town of Miami Shores", which was renamed the "Town of North Miami" in 1931. It was reincorporated as a city in 1953.

The city is also home to the Oleta River State Park, which is the state's largest urban park.

, the population recorded by the U.S. Census Bureau is 60,191. North Miami is the seventh largest city in Miami-Dade County.

History

Early history
In the final phase of Indian inhabitation of the area that eventually became "North Miami", United States Army soldiers in 1856 cut a Military Trail through nearly impassable thickets and rivers connecting Fort Lauderdale to Fort Dallas at the mouth of the Miami River. Even before 1890, a handful of adventuresome pioneers spent brief periods around the Arch Creek Natural Bridge, a centuries-old Indian settlement.

In 1891, Mr. Ilhe was the first to put down roots in the Arch Creek vicinity. He purchased  from the State of Florida at one dollar an acre in the area of today’s N.E. 116th Street and Biscayne Boulevard. The place was so remote that his nearest northern neighbor was thought to live in Ft. Lauderdale. Mr. Ihle built a temporary palmetto frond shelter. During the next 27 years he grew shallots, coontie, squashes, bananas, sugar cane, Puerto Rican pineapples, lemons, guavas, limes, rose apples, Jamaican apples, and tomatoes.

By 1905 the area surrounding the nine-year-old Arch Creek Railroad Depot had become the community’s hub. It was located at 125th Street and the F.E.C. tracks. That year a post office and a school were opened nearby. By 1912, eighteen homes, a church, a general store, a blacksmith shop, and two tomato packing houses were located around the railroad. The population was estimated at less than one hundred. Farming was still the principal occupation.

The Florida land boom that was underway in the 1920s spread to the Arch Creek farming community. The Biscayne Canal was dug in 1924 to remove farmland from flooded conditions. But as a consequence, the soil began to lose its moisture, and the farming which had been the backbone of the economy was no longer profitable. However, in step with the times, this drained land became available for partitioning, lot sales, and development.

Birth of North Miami
Thirty-eight out of the forty-seven registered voters, at the encouragement of developers E.C. Harner, Earl Irons, and Arthur Griffing, showed up and voted to incorporate into a town on February 5, 1926. North Miami, between 1926 and 1931, was named "Town of Miami Shores", partially because its early eastern boundary was the Atlantic Ocean. The Town limits were: bounded on the south by Miami and Miami Beach, on the east by the Atlantic Ocean, on the west by 17th Avenue, and on the north by a line which approximates Golden Glades Drive or 166th Street. Incorporation moved costs from developers to residents and lot purchasers. Late in 1926, a bond issue of $287,000 was passed to build streets, sidewalks, a town hall, a water system, and fire protection.

The devastating September 1926 hurricane burst the real estate land speculation. The local community recovered from the damage, but lot sales came to a stop, and the northern tourist's names showed up in great numbers on the delinquent tax list. Some money from the bond issue was used to build a Spanish-Mediterranean style city hall building at N.E. 8th Avenue and 125th Street in 1928. The City Hall also housed the police and fire departments. In the 1930s a new water plant and gravity tank were installed behind City Hall. The first newspaper, The Miami Shores Bulletin, was published in 1927–1928 and chronicled the events of the times. The historic William Jennings Bryan school was constructed in 1928 on the same spot where the Arch Creek Elementary School had burned down the year before.

The 1930s
Seven miles (11 km) of Atlantic oceanfront beachland property from the Broward County line southward to Surfside were removed from the town limits as a result of a 1931 Florida Supreme Court decision. The 1926 hurricane ended plans for a causeway to deliver municipal services to that area of town. With no services being received, the beach area instituted a lengthy court lawsuit to separate and form their own community.

The wealthy Shoreland Company, located to the south of the Town, lobbied the 1931 Florida Legislature to officially grant their huge development the name "Village of Miami Shores". The Legislature did so. It also passed an official act abolishing "Town of Miami Shores" as a name. The next step was for the local population to choose a new name. The municipality was renamed The Town of North Miami.

During the Depression years, in 1933, Mrs. Cecille Sevier and Mrs. Ella S. Klefeker became the first two women elected to the Town Council. The 1940s census stated that 1,973 inhabitants lived in the "Town of North Miami".

Post World War II growth
At the end of World War II in 1945, the large and constant influx of former military veterans and their young families changed the face of North Miami by ushering in a great growth period. Homebuilding, road building, shops, stores, and office business construction now continued for decades almost without stopping. By 1951 it was reported nationally that North Miami was one of the fastest-growing towns in the United States. During this time, the growing community needed a high school, so in  1951 construction started for North Miami High School. In August 1954, North Miami High School opened its doors for the children of the growing community.

Partially to meet this challenge of fast growth, the voters of North Miami in 1952 voted to adopt a new charter and a new name. The new charter, enacted as an official statute of the Florida Legislature on May 27, 1953, provided for the establishment of a full-time administrative head (City Manager form of government) to carry out the policies of the elected Mayor/Council. The new and present name officially introduced on this date—the City of North Miami.

North Miami is known for its large Haitian-American population. In 2001, voters made Republican Josaphat Celestin the first Haitian American mayor of a large Miami-Dade County community. In 2009, voters made Democrat and Haitian immigrant Andre Pierre mayor of North Miami. In 2013, voters made Haitian American Lucie Tondreau the city's first female Haitian-American Mayor; she soon left office following about being criminally charged. In 2014, voters made Haitian immigrant Dr. Smith Joseph mayor of North Miami. In 2019, voters made Philippe Bien-Aime, who was born in Haiti and migrated to the US in 1993, mayor of North Miami.

Geography

Climate
North Miami has a tropical monsoon climate (Köppen climate classification Am). Summers are very hot and long lasting with very warm nights with very plentiful and heavy rainfall. Winters are short, warm, and dry.

Surrounding areas
  Golden Glades, North Miami Beach
  Opa-locka    Sunny Isles Beach
  Westview   Sunny Isles Beach, Biscayne Bay, Bay Harbor Islands
  Westview    Biscayne Bay
 Pinewood, Unincorporated Miami-Dade County, Biscayne Park

Demographics

2020 census

Note: the US Census treats Hispanic/Latino as an ethnic category. This table excludes Latinos from the racial categories and assigns them to a separate category. Hispanics/Latinos can be of any race.

2010 Census

, there were 22,110 households, with 12.8% being vacant. As of 2000, 37.6% had children under the age of 18 living with them, 39.0% were married couples living together, 20.1% had a female householder with no husband present, and 33.9% were non-families. 26.9% of all households were made up of individuals, and 6.8% had someone living alone who was 65 years of age or older. The average household size was 2.85 and the average family size was 3.51.

In 2000, the city the population was spread out, with 28.1% under the age of 18, 11.3% from 18 to 24, 31.8% from 25 to 44, 19.6% from 45 to 64, and 9.2% who were 65 years of age or older. The median age was 32 years. For every 100 females, there were 92.7 males. For every 100 females age 18 and over, there were 89.0 males.

In 2000, the median income for a household in the city was $29,778, and the median income for a family was $31,760. Males had a median income of $25,388 versus $20,712 for females. The per capita income for the city was $14,581. About 20.7% of families and 23.9% of the population were below the poverty line, including 29.5% of those under age 18 and 17.2% of those age 65 or over.

As of 2000, residents who spoke English as a mother tongue were 35.50% of the population, while French Creole made up 33.28%, Spanish was at 24.89%, and French accounted for 2.69% of the population.

Ethnic groups

 North Miami has a middle class Haitian American population; many Haitians moved from the inner city of Miami to North Miami.

Government

North Miami is governed using the council-manager system. The mayor and the city clerk are elected at large. There are four districts each electing one member of the council. The council has authority over the manager.

Economy

Yogen Früz has its United States East Coast offices in North Miami.

Transportation

In December 2004, the city of North Miami implemented a free community bus service called the NoMi Express, in order to increase the number of local destinations that can be reached through public transit. Since its inauguration in December 2004, the NoMi Express averages approximately 750 boardings per day, which translates to 16,000 boardings per month, or 190,000 boardings annually. The county-wide Metrobus system also serves North Miami.

Attractions

Museums

 The Museum of Contemporary Art (MOCA) is a museum located in the heart of downtown North Miami, Florida. The  structure was designed by the internationally acclaimed architect Charles Gwathmey of Gwathmey Siegel, New York City, who worked in conjunction with the Miami firm of Gelabert-Navia to create the building.
 The Miami Auto Museum displays a large collection of classic cars, Hollywood cars, mini cars, scooters, motorcycles and bicycles from the collection of Michael Dezer.

State parks

 The Oleta River State Park is the largest urban park in the Florida State Park system. In some documents, the park is designated as the Oleta River State Recreation Area. The park contains one of the largest concentrations of Australian pine trees (an invasive species) found  in a Florida state park.

 The Arch Creek Park was formally dedicated on April 25, 1982. Today, Arch Creek is an  site at the junction of N.E. 135th Street and Biscayne Boulevard in North Miami, Fla., and offers many opportunities for botanical, historical and archaeological study. It has a museum/nature center modeled after an early Florida pioneer home, displaying Indian artifacts dug from the grounds, and live animals from the nearby hammock. Remains of the original coontie mill are still visible across the creek, and the park exists as the only preserved archaeological site in the county.

Chinatown

Chinatown is a 90 acre planned revitalization district located on NW 7th Avenue that as of 2019 was still under construction. As of 2020, the project was under some jeopardy due to the COVID-19 pandemic and the resulting anti-Asian sentiment.

Biscayne Landing

Biscayne Landing is a mixed use commercial/hotel/residential community being developed on the site of the Munisport Landfill Superfund Site. The city of North Miami will retain ownership of this brownfield site, and the developers, Boca Developers, will retain a 200-year lease for the development of the project.

As part of the development agreement for the site, the project's developer has also committed to renovating the city's library and building a school, Olympic training facility, and affordable housing on several sites located in North Miami. Completion of all elements of the project are projected by 2021.

A portion of the Biscayne Landing site includes some of the wetlands of Biscayne Bay, which will be preserved in the form of a  environmental park, containing nature hikes, jogging paths, information plaques that describe the resident wildlife and trees, benches, a canoe landing and a boat house. It will also have connecting trails to Oleta River State Park. This area is the site of a former trash dump and is the home to a large sewage treatment plant nearby.

In 2009, Biscayne Landing was reeling in the real estate downturn. Most of the units in the two buildings online were uninhabited; very few were selling. There is little actual construction on any other project related to their contractual obligations under a redevelopment agreement with the city of North Miami.

Recently the now defunct Biscayne Landing was acquired by the Soffers (Aventura Mall Developers) and LeFranks and together are building SoleMia. This development will be over 1Million square feet and is the largest mixed-use construction project in the U.S. http://solemiamiami.com/master-plan

Education

Primary and secondary schools

Miami-Dade County Public Schools serves North Miami.

Elementary schools

 Benjamin Franklin Elementary School
 Biscayne Gardens Elementary School
 Gratigny Elementary
 North Miami Elementary School
 Natural Bridge Elementary School
 W. J. Bryan Elementary School

Middle schools

 Thomas Jefferson Middle School
 North Miami Middle School

K–8 centers

 David Lawrence Jr. K–8 Center
 Linda Lentin K–8 Center

High schools

 Alonzo and Tracy Mourning Senior High Biscayne Bay Campus
 North Miami Senior High School
 MAST@FIU BBC

Private schools

 Northwest Christian Academy
 Holy Cross Lutheran School
 Yeshiva Toras Chaim
 Miami Union Academy SDA
 Montessori School of North Miami
 Get Smart Kids Academy

Colleges and universities

 Florida International University (Biscayne Bay Campus)

Public libraries

The North Miami public library is the city's library. While over the years the county wide Miami-Dade Public Library System has taken over the libraries of most of the cities in the county, the North Miami public library has remained independent.
The North Miami Public Library was first opened in 1932 by the Biscayne Park Woman's Club. When the library first opened it was located at the City of North Miami's town hall under the supervision of E.May Avil the City Clerk. The library was closed during World War II and it was reopened in September 1945 in the same location at the town hall and still under the supervision of the City Clerk E. May Avil. At this time the library was funded by donations and member fees.
“In 1948 the Biscayne Park Woman’s Club turned the library over to the city of North Miami and in 1949 a public referendum established a free Public Library under provisions of the Florida Statutes, setting up a Library Fund and a Library board to administer the operation. Twin sisters, Mrs. Edla Lunden and Mrs. Alma Anderson, were appointed as Librarian and Assistant Librarian, respectively”. After the twins retired, Miss Phyllis Gray served from 1955 to 1959 as the library's first professional Librarian. Today Lucia M. Gonzalez is the current Library Director.
In the fall of 2003 the North Miami Public Library's Director signed a Reciprocal Borrowing Agreement with the public library directors of the cities of North Miami Beach, Hialeah and the Miami-Dade Public Library System thereby allowing their patrons free access to the participating libraries. Today the library is undergoing a $1.5 million renovation and the main building is closed to the public, limited library services are available from an annex building next to the main building. The library re-opening is planned for some time in June or July 2015. Library information can be accessed at the library's website.

Recipients for Key to the City

All past recipients to the "Key to the City" for North Miami:
 2012 Kim and Kourtney Kardashian
 2013 Gregory Toussaint (Pastor)
2018 Eduardo Padron (President of Miami Dade College)

See also

 Arch Creek
 Biscayne Landing
 Miami-Dade County, Florida
 Munisport Landfill
 Museum of Contemporary Art, North Miami
 North Miami High School
 North Miami Middle School
 Oleta River State Park

References

External links

 City of North Miami
 City of North Miami History
 North Miami Police Department
 North Miami Community Redevelopment Agency

 
Cities in Miami-Dade County, Florida
Haitian-American culture in Florida
Populated places on the Intracoastal Waterway in Florida
Populated places established in 1926
Cities in Florida
Cities in Miami metropolitan area